Anant Mane (1915-1995) was a film director from Kolhapur, Maharashtra, India who directed  approximately 60 movies during the golden era of Marathi cinema. He was known for making films based on the folk art form Tamasha, and also directed a number of family melodramas. He teamed up with the music director Vasant Pawar and directed several hit movies in the 1960s, 1970s and 1980s.

Mane's 1961 film Manini won the President's Silver Medal for best regional film of the year.

In 2006, the Lokmanch Charitable Trust, Kolhapur, instituted an annual Anant Mane award for outstanding contribution to the Marathi film industry.

Filmography

References 

1995 deaths
1915 births